Morgane Métraux (born 18 March 1997) is a Swiss professional golfer who plays on the LPGA Tour and the Ladies European Tour (LET). In 2021, she won the Symetra Tour's Island Resort Championship, which helped her graduate to the LPGA Tour. In 2022, she won the Ladies Italian Open.

Amateur career
Métraux started playing golf at the age of ten, together with her sister Kim Métraux, who is also an LET member. At 15, she played in her first international event at the 2012 Junior Open Championship, made the cut and soon became part of the Swiss National Team.

She represented Switzerland at the 2013 European Girls' Team Championship and three European Ladies' Team Championships (2014, 2015, 2016), where the team won a silver (2015) and a bronze medal (2014). She also played in two editions of the Espirito Santo Trophy together with her sister in 2014 and in 2016, where the team won the silver medal behind South Korea. She also participated in the 2017 Vagliano Trophy in Bogogno, Italy, where her team (Continental Europe) won 15–9.

Individually, Métraux was runner-up at the 2013 Austrian International Amateur and won the 2015 Swiss International Championship. She participated in four European Ladies Amateur Championships, earning a third and fourth place in 2017 and 2016 respectively, signing for her career best score of 62 (–10) in the second round of the 2016 edition. Another amateur achievement was qualifying for the 2017 U.S. Women's Open in Bedminster, New Jersey.

Métraux graduated from Auguste Piccard High School in 2014 and in August, at the age of 17, joined Florida State University where she won three times individually in her junior year and six times with her team. During her career with Florida State Seminoles women's golf, she earned All-America honors for both her junior and senior years. Her best personal finish at the NCAA Division I Women's Golf Championships was a tie for 5th in 2018. She graduated in April 2018 with a degree in Business Management.

Professional career
Métraux turned professional in May 2018, after completing her college career. She joined the Symetra Tour and played in 13 events and made 11 cuts, recording two T8 finishes at the IOA Golf Classic and the Donald Ross Classic at French Lick, Indiana, and ended her rookie season 47th on the money list. 

In February 2019, Métraux injured her shoulder and missed out on the entire 2019 season. Her first event back was the 2020 LET Q-School, where she earned membership in Category 8 for the 2020 season. On the 2020 Ladies European Tour, she recorded a season-best finished of tenth at the inaugural Saudi Ladies International, helped by a final round of 67. She finished the season 45th on the Costa del Sol Order of Merit.

Métraux won her first professional tournament at the Island Resort Championship on the 2021 Symetra Tour, which also earned her exemption into the 2021 Evian Championship. 

The win helped her climb past her sister in the Women's World Golf Rankings and qualify for the 2020 Summer Olympics in Tokyo. She later decided to opt out of playing in the Olympics, to focus on the Evian and the Symetra Tour, enabling her sister Kim Métraux to represent Switzerland alongside Albane Valenzuela. The decision paid off and Métraux was one of the Symetra Tour's top ten money winners at the end of the season, and gained a fully exempt card on the LPGA Tour for the 2022 season.

In 2022, she won the Ladies Italian Open after a playoff with Meghan MacLaren and Italian amateur Alessandra Fanali.

Amateur wins
2013 Credit Suisse Junior Tour Event - Kandern
2015 Swiss International Championship
2016 The Schooner Fall Classic 
2017 Seminole Match Up, Dickson Invitational

Sources:

Professional wins (2)

Ladies European Tour wins (1)

Ladies European Tour playoff record (1–1)

Symetra Tour wins (1)

Team appearances
Amateur
European Young Masters (representing Switzerland): 2013 
European Girls' Team Championship (representing Switzerland): 2013
European Ladies' Team Championship (representing Switzerland): 2014, 2015, 2016
Espirito Santo Trophy (representing Switzerland): 2014, 2016
Vagliano Trophy (representing the Continent of Europe): 2017 (winners)

Source:

References

External links

Morgane Metraux at the Florida State Seminoles official site

Swiss female golfers
Florida State Seminoles women's golfers
LPGA Tour golfers
Ladies European Tour golfers
Sportspeople from Lausanne
1997 births
Living people
20th-century Swiss women
21st-century Swiss women